India–Tanzania relations refers to the current and historical relations between India and Tanzania. India has a High Commission in Dar es Salaam, Tanzania has a High Commission in New Delhi, which is also accredited to Sri Lanka, Nepal, Bangladesh and Myanmar. Diplomatic relations are described as close, friendly and cooperative. 15,000 Indians visited Tanzania in 2007. In May 2011, Ex Prime Minister of India Manmohan Singh calls for strengthen cooperation with Tanzania. Trade between India and Tanzania amounted to 31 billion dollars in 2009–2010 and India is Tanzania's second-largest investor.

From the 1960s to the 1980s, both countries had the same view on anti-racism and anti-colonialism. In November 1962, India opened a High Commission in Dar es Salaam and consulate general in Zanzibar in October 1974.

Exchange of visits

Besides the exchanging visits of Foreign Ministers and other high level Government Dignitaries, the two countries have also witnessed the exchange of visits of their high level Government and Political Leaders as shown below;

Tanzania High Level Visits to India

India High Level Visits to Tanzania

Bilateral agreements

 Joint Permanent Commission signed on 17 January 1975. The Seventh JPC met in New Delhi from 13 to 14 January 2009.
 Agreement on Avoidance of Double Taxation and Prevention of Fiscal Evasion (1979). The 3rd round of talks for review of the same was held in New Delhi from 28 to 30 April 2009 and a new one was signed in Dar es Salaam on 27 May 2011.
 Agreement on Friendship and Technical, Economic and Scientific Cooperation (28 January 1966).
 Air Services Agreement (1995) Talks were held in Dar es Salaam in April 2006 to update the Agreement.
 MOU for Cooperation in the field of Agriculture was signed on 16 December 2002 during the visit of President Benjamin William Mkapa to India.
 Loan agreement between Exim Bank and Tanzanian government on a line of credit for $268.35 million for extension of pipeline project was  signed during Tanzania President Kikwete visit to India. 
 Cooperation in the field of hydrology, tourism and agriculture.

Non-governmental agreements

 Agreement in the field of Health & Medicine signed on 16 December 2002 during the visit of President Benjamin William Mkapa to India.
 Exchange Program on Cooperation in the field of Higher Education signed on 27 April 2003.
 Trade Agreement was signed on 14 January 2000. Pursuant to the Agreement a Joint Trade Committee was established. The second meeting of the JTC was held in New Delhi from 16 – 18 May 2007.
 MOU on Defense Cooperation signed on 1 October 2003 in New Delhi.
 Duty Free Tariff Preference Scheme offered by India (Tanzania Accessed the scheme from 22 May 2009).
 Bilateral Investment Promotion Protection Agreement (BIPPA) The first negotiating meeting was held in New Delhi in January, 2010. Final fine tuning of the Agreement still outstanding.
 Recent announcements and signed agreements (During Hon. Manmohan Singh Visit to Tanzania in May 2011)
 India will avail US$100,000 Grant Money for school laboratory Equipments
 India will avail US$10,000,000 Grant Money for Capacity building on Social and Education Sectors.
 India promised to help establishing a Vocational training centre in Zanzibar
 A line of Credit facility amounting to US$180 Million for water projects (Dar es Salaam and Coast) is available to Tanzania.
 India and Tanzania signed an agreement on Avoidance of double taxation and Prevention of Fiscal Evasion with respect to taxes on Income.
 India and Tanzania signed a Joint Action Plan between Small Scale Development Organization (SIDO – Tanzania) and National Small Industries Corporation Ltd of (NSIC – India).
 Preliminary joint venture agreement between Apollo Hospitals and NSSF Tanzania for building Apollo Hospital in Dare s salaam Tanzania was signed.
 Also during the India's Prime Minister Visit to Tanzania, the India-Tanzania Centre of Excellence in “Information and Communication Technology” was inaugurated in Dar es Salaam at the Dar es Salaam Institute of Technology.
 MoU on cooperation between the Zanzibar Institute if Financial Administration (ZIFA) and the Indian Institute of Applied Manpower Resources (IAMR).
 Agreement on the Establishment of Joint Business Council between FICCI &ASSOCHAM, and the Tanzania Chamber of Commerce, Industry & Agriculture –TCCIA signed on 25 June 1997.
 MOU between CII and the Confederation of Tanzanian Industries - CTI signed on 4 October 1996.
 Cooperation Agreement between Indian Merchants’ Chamber (IMC) and TCCIA – signed on 11 July 1995.
 MoU for establishing India-Tanzania Centre of Excellence in ICT at the Dar es Salaam Institute of Technology – signed on March, 2008.
 MOU between the Indo-Africa Chambers of Commerce and Industry – IACCI and the Zanzibar National Chamber of Commerce Industry and Agriculture – ZNCCIA signed on 28 April 2011
 India's government has offered $100 million to improve water supply in the commercial capital Dar es Salaam and $280 million to help supply water from Lake Victoria to Tabora, Nzega and Igunga town.
 Both countries have agreed to establish a Joint Working Group to strengthen cooperation in counter terrorism.
 Calling India a deserving nation for permanent membership of the U.N. Security Council, Tanzanian President Kikwete said, his country will continue to work with other African countries to back New Delhi's candidature.

Bilateral relations

From the 1960s to the 1980s the political relationship was driven largely by shared ideological commitments to anti-colonialism, socialism in various forms as well as genuine desire for South-South Cooperation. In recent years Indo-Tanzanian ties have evolved into a modern and pragmatic relationship with greater and diversified economic engagement. India is the leading trading partner of Tanzania's as well as an important source of essential machinery and pharmaceutical products. Many of the top business establishments of Tanzania are owned by members of the Indian origin. Indians form the largest expatriate community in Tanzania and their positive contribution in the progress and development of their host country is well recognised and appreciated. A friendship, technical, economic and scientific cooperation was signed in 1966. In 1975, a cultural agreement was signed. In 2008, a memorandum of understanding on tourism was signed between India and Tanzania. There are approximately 50,000 to 60,000 PIOs living and working in Tanzania. In addition there are approximately 10000 Indian expatriates.

Indian community in Tanzania

The first Indian diaspora came to Tanzania shortly after World War I, when the League of Nations designed Tanzania as a British protectorate. 40.000 Indians live in Tanzania, predominantly in Dar es Salaam, Arusha, Dodoma, Morogoro, Mwanza, Mbeya and Zanzibar.

References

External links

 
Tanzania
Tanzania
Bilateral relations of Tanzania
India and the Commonwealth of Nations
Tanzania and the Commonwealth of Nations